Nikolai Aleksandrovich Tolstykh (born 30 January 1956) is a Russian football administrator and a former player.

Playing career
As a player, he made his professional debut in the Soviet Top League in 1977 for FC Dynamo Moscow.

Later career
He has been the president of the Russian Professional Football League since its founding in 1992. Until 2001 that organization conducted the Russian Top Division competition, and since that year it is limited to Russian First Division and Russian Second Division. From 2012 to 2015 he served as the president of Russian Football Union.

European club competitions
With FC Dynamo Moscow.

 European Cup Winners' Cup 1979–80: 1 game.
 UEFA Cup 1980–81: 2 games.
 UEFA Cup 1982–83: 2 games.

References

1956 births
Footballers from Moscow
Living people
Russian footballers
Soviet footballers
FC Dynamo Moscow players
Soviet Top League players
Association football defenders
Russian football chairmen and investors
Recipients of the Medal of the Order "For Merit to the Fatherland" II class
Presidents of the Russian Football Union